The English Football League play-offs are a series of play-off matches contested by the four association football teams finishing immediately below the automatic promotion places in the second, third and fourth tiers of the English football league system, namely the EFL Championship, EFL League One and EFL League Two. , the play-offs comprise two semi-finals, each conducted as a two-legged tie with games played at each side's home ground.  The aggregate winners of the semi-finals progress to the final which is contested at Wembley Stadium, where the victorious side is promoted to the league above, and the runners-up remain in the same division. In the event of drawn ties or finals, extra time followed by a penalty shoot-out are employed as necessary.

The play-offs were first introduced to the English Football League in 1987 and have been staged at the conclusion of every season since. The first three play-off seasons saw the finals also being conducted over two legs, on a home-and-away basis. Since 1990 the winners of each division's play-off competition have been determined in a one-off final. The venue for the final was the original Wembley Stadium for ten years before being moved to the Millennium Stadium in Cardiff, Wales, during Wembley's reconstruction, between 2000 and 2006. Since then, the finals have taken place at the renovated Wembley Stadium every year with the exception of 2011 when the third- and fourth-tier finals were hosted at Old Trafford as a result of a clash of fixtures with that year's UEFA Champions League final. The highest attendance for a championship final was in the 2013–14 season that saw QPR beat Derby County 1–0 with a crowd of 87,348 The play-off finals took place behind closed doors in the 2020 season as a result of the COVID-19 pandemic in the United Kingdom while a restricted attendance watched the following season's finals.

In 2020, Deloitte reported that the club winning the Championship play-off final could expect a financial bonus of between £135million and £265million. This has led to the second-tier play-off final being variously described as the "one of the most lucrative games in all of football" and "the richest game in football".

History
The mid-1980s saw a decline in attendances at football matches and public disenchantment with English football.  A number of instances of violence and tragedy struck the game. In March 1985 at the semi-final of the 1984–85 Football League Cup between Chelsea and Sunderland more than 100 people were arrested after various invasions of the Stamford Bridge pitch and more than 40 people, including 20 policemen, were injured. Nine days later, violence flared at the FA Cup match between Millwall and Luton Town: seats were used as missiles against the police and resulted in Luton Town banning away supporters.  On 11 May, 56 people were killed and 265 injured in the Bradford City stadium fire and less than three weeks later, 39 supporters died and more than 600 were injured in the Heysel Stadium disaster where Liverpool were playing Juventus in the European Cup final.

In an attempt to persuade fans to return to the stadia, the Football League had rejected a £19million television deal to broadcast matches live on the BBC and ITV before the 1985–86 Football League season, with League president Jack Dunnett suggesting that "football is prepared to have a year or two with no television".  In December 1985 a ten-point plan was agreed which aimed to revitalise the financial affairs of the league.  This "Heathrow Agreement" included a structural reorganisation of the league, reducing the top tier from 22 clubs to 20, and the introduction of play-offs to facilitate the change.  The play-offs were brought in at the end of the 1986–87 Football League season.  They were initially introduced for two years, with the proviso that if they were successful with the general public they would be retained permanently.

Format

History
For the first two seasons after the play-offs were inaugurated, the semi-finals were played between the three sides finishing below the automatic promotion sides and the team one place above the relegation zone in the division above.

Current

, the English Football League play-offs involve the four teams that finish directly below the automatic promotion places in each of the Championship, League One and League Two, respectively the second, third, and fourth tiers of the English football league system. These teams meet in a series of play-off matches to determine the final team that will be promoted. The best-ranked team that fail to get automatically promoted plays the worst team that make the playoffs, in a two-legged tie while the other two teams play in each other in a two-legged tie: these matches are referred to as the "play-off semi-finals". The first leg between two teams in the semi-finals is played at the ground of the side with the lower position in the league, while the second leg takes place at the higher-ranking side's ground.  According to the EFL, "this is designed to give the highest finishing team an advantage".

The winner of each semi-final is determined by the aggregate score across the two legs, with the number of goals scored in each match of the tie being added together.  The team with the higher aggregate score qualifies for the final.  If, at the end of regular 90 minutes of the second leg, the aggregate score is level then the match goes into extra time where two 15-minute halves are played. If the score remains level at the end of extra time, the tie is decided by a penalty shootout.  The away goals rule does not apply in the play-off semi-finals.  The clubs that win the semi-finals then meet at Wembley Stadium, a neutral venue, for a one-off match referred to as the "play-off final".  If required, extra time and a penalty shootout can be employed in the same manner as for the semi-finals to determine the winner.  The runner-up and losing semi-finalists remain in the same league while the winning side are promoted.

Changes to format
During the first two stagings of the play-offs in 1987 and 1988, the four teams involved were the three clubs that finished directly below the automatic promotions positions, plus the club which finished directly above the automatic relegation places in the division above, similar to the Football League test matches of the 1890s.

This was part of the league's two-season-long restructuring that would reduce the number of teams in the top tier (from 22 to 20) while increasing them in the lower divisions (creating three divisions of 24 clubs); during these seasons, only one club (Charlton Athletic in 1987) that entered the play-offs in a relegation place managed to win the play-offs and therefore retain their divisional status.

In the seasons prior to the 1990 play-offs, the finals were two-legged ties with both teams hosting the other once. If the two teams could not be separated, a tie-breaker was then staged at a neutral venue. This was used on three occasions: 
the 1987 Second Division final was played at Birmingham City's St. Andrews; the 1987 Third Division final was played at Crystal Palace's Selhurst Park;
and the 1988 Third Division final was played at Walsall's Fellows Park (though this was not a neutral venue, as Walsall was one of the clubs involved).

Before the 1999–2000 season away goals were used as a tie-breaker after extra time had been played, however, this was abolished following a club initiative launched by then-Ipswich Town chairman David Sheepshanks, after his club had twice lost on away goals in 1997 and 1999. Since then away goals have played no part in the play-off system.

Proposed changes
A change to the format of the play-offs was proposed by Crystal Palace chief executive Phil Alexander in 2003. Alexander recommended expanding the number of teams in each play-off series from four to six, providing more clubs with a chance at promotion. Additionally, the two-legged semi-finals would have been replaced by one-off quarter-final and semi-final games, both of which would give home advantage to the team that finished higher during the league season. The two highest placed clubs in the play-off series would advance directly to the semi-final, while the other four clubs would contest the quarter-final.

The proposed changes were narrowly approved by Football League chairmen and were set to be voted upon at the league's annual general meeting. The motion was withdrawn however, due to objections received from the Premier League and The Football Association.

Venues

Throughout the history of the English Football League play-offs, the semi-finals have been conducted as two-legged matches played at the two stadia of the competing teams, less than a week apart.  Between the 1987 and 1989 Football League play-offs, the finals were also played on a home-and-away basis over two matches, occasionally with a replay being required: in the 1988 Football League Third Division play-off final, the aggregate score after the two legs between Walsall and Bristol City was 3–3, so a penalty shoot-out was used to determine which side would host the replay.  Walsall won 4–2 and earned the right to play the deciding match at their home ground, Fellows Park, where they triumphed 4–0.

From the 1990 play-offs, each play-off final was a single match, which was hosted at the original Wembley Stadium.  Typically, the finals of the three divisions would take place, one match per day, across the second bank holiday weekend in May.  During that first "Wembley Weekend" in 1990, spectators totalled almost 130,000, including nearly 73,000 for the Second Division final between Swindon Town and Sunderland.  This was markedly greater than the largest crowd during the 1989–90 First Division season, around 47,000, at Old Trafford to watch Manchester United against Arsenal, and roughly the same as the attendance at the 1990 FIFA World Cup Final.  All of the second tier play-off finals played between 1990 and 1999 attracted crowds in excess of 55,000 with half of them seeing more than 70,000 in attendance.  During that period, the record attendance for the third-tier decider came at the 1999 Football League Second Division play-off final when 76,935 people watched Manchester City beat Gillingham in a penalty shoot-out after scoring twice in the final two minutes to force the match into extra time.  The former Wembley Stadium record for attendance in the fourth tier play-off final came in 1997 when a crowd of 46,804 witnessed Northampton Town's John Frain score in the last minute of the match to beat Swansea City 1–0.

The play-off finals were held outside England for the first time from the 2000 season.  Due to the redevelopment of Wembley Stadium, along with the FA Cup Final, they were hosted by the Millennium Stadium in Cardiff, Wales.  Teams who prepared for matches, including in cup competitions, in the south changing room went undefeated in twelve consecutive games, however the "jinx" was broken in the 2002 Football League Second Division play-off final when Stoke City beat Brentford after having used the north changing room.  Attendances at the Welsh national stadium continued to be high with the second tier finals attracting more than 65,000 spectators on all but one occasion, and the 2003 third tier final watched by 66,096 people when Cardiff City beat Queens Park Rangers 1–0 with an extra-time goal from Andy Campbell.

The play-off finals returned to Wembley Stadium for the first time after its renovation in the 2007 season, and over the next five seasons attendances improved further.  The 2007 fourth tier play-off final between Bristol Rovers and Shrewsbury Town drew a crowd of 61,589, while 75,132 people watched Doncaster Rovers beat Leeds United 1–0 in the 2008 Football League One play-off final.  The same season saw 86,703 in attendance at the Championship play-off final in which Hull City beat Bristol City 1–0.  Owing to the 2011 UEFA Champions League Final being held at Wembley Stadium on 28 May 2011, it was confirmed in January 2011 that Wembley would host the Championship play-off final on 30 May, while Old Trafford would host the League Two and League One finals on the preceding two days.  From the 2012 final onwards, all three division's final match was hosted by the national stadium.  For the 2020 finals, all three games were delayed until August and played behind closed doors, with an official attendance of zero, as a result of the COVID-19 pandemic in the United Kingdom.  The following season, a restricted number of supporters were allowed to attend the finals.  The 2021 EFL Championship play-off final was watched by 11,689 spectators, while the third and fourth tier finals both saw crowds of under 10,000.

Prize

The significant financial boost from winning the Championship play-off final has led to it being described as "one of the most lucrative games in all of football", and "the richest game in soccer".  Accountants Deloitte described the 2020 final as the "contest for biggest financial prize in world football" with promotion worth at least £135million in the first season after promotion and an additional £130million the following season should an immediate relegation be avoided. However, by convention the two finalists agree that the loser will keep all the gate receipts from the game, so as to slightly soften the financial blow of missing out.

As the gulf in financial power between clubs in the Premier League and the Championship widened, in the 2006-07 season parachute payments were introduced to reduce the impact of relegation.  Thus for two seasons following relegation a club would receive half of the per-club Premier League basic television money.  The parachute payments were intended to lower the risk of a club going into administration due to the high cost base (mainly player wages) they brought from the higher division.  In addition "solidarity payments" from the Premier League worth £1m were paid to each Championship club to help mitigate concerns about the impact the parachute payments might have to the competitive balance of the league.  As a result, should the Championship play-off winners be relegated in their first season in the Premier League,  they would still receive a total of around £75million in "parachute payments" over the next two seasons.

The financial value of winning the EFL League One play-off is the additional remuneration clubs receive in the Championship.   clubs in the third tier receive around £1.4million, comprising a "basic award" and a "solidarity" payment, the latter of which is funded by the Premier League.  In the second tier, the total funding rises to around £7million, a fivefold increase in revenue.   Similarly the financial benefit of winning the lower league play-offs is derived from the additional remuneration clubs receive in the league above. For example, clubs in League One receive around £675,000 from the Premier League as a "core club" payment compared to £450,000 in League Two.  The winners of each final also receive a trophy.

Past winners

See also
Football League test matches

Notes

References

Bibliography

External links 
 Football League play-offs
 RSSSF Football League archive, 1888–2008